Casanegra may refer to:
Casanegra (novel)
Casanegra (film)